Orange Garden Pop (stylized as ORANGE GARDEN POP) is the second compilation album by Japanese singer-songwriter Yui. It was released on December 5, 2012, simultaneously with another compilation album Green Garden Pop. The album reached #3 on Oricon. It was certified Platinum by the Recording Industry Association of Japan. In South Korea, the album reached #87 on the Gaon Album Chart.

In November 2012, a couple of weeks before the release of the album, Yui announced her decision to go on a hiatus at the end of the year. The album was described as YUI's first and probably last "best of" album.

Track listing

References 

Yui (singer) albums
2012 compilation albums